Charles "Cha" Dwyer (born 1994) is an Irish hurler who plays as a left wing-forward for the Laois senior team.

Born in Ballinakill, County Laois, Dwyer first played competitive hurling during his schooling at Castlecomer Community School. He arrived on the inter-county scene at the age of seventeen when he first linked up with the Laois minor team before later joining the under-21 side. He made his senior debut during the 2013 league. Dwyer subsequently became a regular member of the starting fifteen.

At club level, Dwyer plays with the Ballinakill GAA.

Honours

Team

Castlecomer Community School
All Ireland Association Community Comprehensive Schools Championship (1): 2011

Carlow Institute of Technology
Higher Education GAA Senior Hurling League (1): 2014

References

1994 births
Living people
Ballinakill hurlers
Laois inter-county hurlers